Chasing Hope is the twelfth studio album by Japanese singer Bonnie Pink. It was released on July 25, 2012, by Warner Music Japan. The title was chosen due to the 2011 Tōhoku earthquake and tsunami, as Pink wanted to "deliver hope to Japanese people through music after the earthquake."

The album was released in two editions: a standard edition, and a limited edition with a DVD of performances from her 2010 "Dear Diary" tour at the Akasaka Blitz.

Prior to the album's release, all songs on the album were free to stream on the iTunes Store from July 18th to July 24th; this was the first time a Japanese artist did this.

Track listing

Charts

References 

Bonnie Pink albums
2012 albums
Songs about the 2011 Tōhoku earthquake and tsunami
Warner Music Japan albums